Mariah's World is an American reality show that premiered on December 4, 2016 on the E! cable network. Announced in March 2016, the eight-episode series follows the life of singer Mariah Carey as she begins her The Sweet Sweet Fantasy Tour around Europe and plans to get married. "I refuse to call it a reality show," said Carey in an interview with The New York Times. She further commented that the goal of the series is for her fans to get to know her personality better and not to show that, "Here I am, getting my nails done."

Episodes

Reception
Mariah's World has received generally mixed-to-negative reviews from television critics. Rotten Tomatoes accumulated a 44% "rotten" rating. Similarly, review aggregator website Metacritic calculated a mean average rating of 51 out of 100, indicating "mixed or average reviews".

Broadcast
Internationally, the series has aired in Australia and New Zealand on the local version of E! in simulcast with the American premiere.

The series has aired in the UK, Ireland and France on the local version of E! on December 16, 2016.

References

2010s American reality television series
2016 American television series debuts
2017 American television series endings
Mariah Carey
English-language television shows
E! original programming
Television series based on singers and musicians
Television series by Bunim/Murray Productions